Syed Gaji Shah was a Muslim saint. His mausoleum is at a distance of about 65 kilometers from Dadu City, Dadu District, Sindh, Pakistan. He is locally famous as the king of dejins. Thousands of people visit his shrine, especially during his yearly fair held at his shrine. Historically it is believed that Gaji Shah was saintly general of Kalhora Dynasty and he was appointed here by Mian Naseer Muhammad Kalhoro to defend and face the attacks at leading passes to Sindh in Kirthar Mountains area.
The most ancient archaeological site of Ghazi Shah Mound explored by N. G. Majumdar was named after Syed Gaji Shah which is closest to his shrine.

References 

Muslim saints
Sindhi people